None But the Brave is a 1960 American CinemaScope Western film starring Richard Basehart. It was also known as The Golden Touch and For the Love of Mike.

Plot
A young priest comes to a town where an old priest wants to build a church before he dies.

Cast
 Richard Basehart as Father Francis Phelan
 Stuart Erwin as Doctor Henry G. Mills (as Stu Erwin)
 Arthur Shields as Father Walsh
 Armando Silvestre as Tony Eagle
 Elsa Cárdenas as Mrs. Eagle
 Murray Stecker as Ty Corbin (as Michael Steckler)
 Rex Allen as himself
 Danny Bravo as Michael (as Danny Zaidiver)

Production
It was the first film from a new company formed by director George Sherman. It was filmed in Mexico in February 1960.

See also
 List of American films of 1960

References

External links
 
 
 

1960 films
Films directed by George Sherman
American Western (genre) films
1960s English-language films
1960 Western (genre) films
20th Century Fox films
1960s American films